Charles Wells may refer to:

Organisations
 Charles Wells Ltd, founded 1876, the Charles Wells Family Brewery
 Wells & Young's Brewery, formed 2006, the brewing operation of Charles Wells Ltd and Young's

People
 Charles Wells (American politician) (1786–1866), American politician, mayor of Boston 1832–1833
 Charles Jeremiah Wells (1799–1879), English poet
 Charles Wells Russell (1818–1867), politician during the American Civil War
 Charles Wells (gambler) (1841–1922), gambler and one of the men who broke the bank at Monte Carlo
 Charles Wells (brewer) (1842–1914), British brewer
 Charles D. Wells (1849–?), member of the Wisconsin State Assembly
 Charlie Wells (Charles Wells 1892—1929), Australian Rules footballer
 Sir Charles Wells, 2nd Baronet (1908–1996)
 Charles Wells (Australian politician) (1911–1984), member of the South Australian Parliament
 Charles Wells (mathematician) (1937–2017), American mathematician
 Charles T. Wells (born 1939), member of the Florida Supreme Court
 Bubba Wells (Charles Richard Wells, born 1974), American basketball player

Other
 Charles Wells House, built 1894, historic house in Reading, Massachusetts